Aksarovo (Aqharı) is a rural locality (a village) in Muraptalovsky Selsoviet, Kuyurgazinsky District, Bashkortostan, Russia. The population was 321 as of 2010. There are 5 streets.

Geography 
Aksarovo is located 29 km south of Yermolayevo (the district's administrative centre) by road. Yushatyrka is the nearest rural locality.

References 

Rural localities in Kuyurgazinsky District